Pietro Piller Cottrer (born 20 December 1974) is an Italian former cross-country skier who won gold medal in the 4 ×10 km relay at the 2006 Winter Olympics in Turin. He was born at Sappada in the province of Udine.

Career
Piller Cottrer's first relevant success in the cross-country skiing world cup came in 1997, when he won the 50 km race at the Holmenkollen Ski Festival. In the same year he won the bronze medal with the Italian relay at the 1997 World Championships in Trondheim. Thanks to Piller Cottrer's presence, the Italian relay confirmed as one of the best in the world winning silver medal in the 2002 Winter Olympics and, better, to gold medal in the home Olympics of Turin. He also won an Olympic bronze medal in the 15 + 15 km pursuit.

His successes include a World Championship gold medal in the 15 km freestyle pursuit at the 2005 World Championships, and a total of seven victories in the World Cup. The latest in Vancouver 2009.

Piller Cottrer won a bronze medal in the 15 km + 15 km double pursuit at the 2007 World Championships in Sapporo.

At the 2010 Winter Olympics in Vancouver Piller Cottrer skied a 34:00.9 in the 15 km freestyle event and won the silver medal. In February 2013, Piller Cottrer announced his retirement.

Cross-country skiing results
All results are sourced from the International Ski Federation (FIS).

Olympic Games
 4 medals – (1 gold, 2 silver, 1 bronze)

World Championships
 3 medals – (1 gold, 2 bronze)

World Cup

Season standings

Individual podiums
6 victories – (5 , 1 ) 
21 podiums – (20 , 1 )

Team podiums
 4 victories – (4 ) 
 20 podiums – (19 , 1 ) 

Note:  Until the 1999 World Championships, World Championship races were included in the World Cup scoring system.

References

External links
 
 Holmenkollen winners since 1892 - click Vinnere for downloadable pdf file 
  
 Piller Cottrer retires

1974 births
Cross-country skiers at the 1998 Winter Olympics
Cross-country skiers at the 2002 Winter Olympics
Cross-country skiers at the 2006 Winter Olympics
Cross-country skiers at the 2010 Winter Olympics
Holmenkollen Ski Festival winners
Italian male cross-country skiers
Living people
Olympic cross-country skiers of Italy
Olympic gold medalists for Italy
Olympic silver medalists for Italy
Olympic bronze medalists for Italy
Sportspeople from the Province of Belluno
Olympic medalists in cross-country skiing
FIS Nordic World Ski Championships medalists in cross-country skiing
Tour de Ski skiers
Medalists at the 2010 Winter Olympics
Medalists at the 2006 Winter Olympics
Medalists at the 2002 Winter Olympics
Cross-country skiers of Centro Sportivo Carabinieri